Sir Theodore Andrea Cook (28 March 1867 – 16 September 1928) was a British art critic and writer.

Sporting activities

Theodore Cook spent his early years in Wantage after his father, Henry Cook, became the
headmaster of King Alfred's School in 1868, a year after his eldest son was born. He subsequently studied at Radley College, where he also pursued sporting activities becoming captain of the football and boating teams. He continued his studies in Classics, at Wadham College, Oxford where he was a member of the boat club, and participated for Oxford in the 1889 Boat Race. He stayed in Oxford after graduation and in 1891 founded the "University Fencing Club". He continued being interested in fencing and was captain of the English Fencing Team in the 1903 championships in Paris and the 1906 championships in Athens. He was involved in the arrangements for the Olympic Games of 1908 in London, being one of the three British representatives on the International Olympic Committee.

He won a silver medal in the art competitions at the 1920 Olympic Games for his "Olympic Games of Antwerp".

Activity as writer and publisher

Theodore Cook's legacy from his artist mother was an early introduction to the world of paintings, sculpture and architecture. This inspired him to travel particularly in Europe and to publish authoritarian works on Old Provence, 25 Great Houses of France, Leonardo da Vinci, and sculpture, among many others, some of which were illustrated by his mother.

This led Cook into journalism. He was for some years editor of the St. James Gazette, the paper edited "for gentlemen by gentlemen". As a freelance he wrote for the old Standard and contributed to the Daily Telegraph articles on rowing by "An Old Blue". 

In 1910, he became editor of The Field, the County Gentleman's Newspaper, a position he still held at the time of his death in 1928. 

His knighthood in 1916 was, in his opinion, a recognition of the work for the war effort by his magazine rather than of his own individual contribution. He died of a heart attack on 16 September 1928, aged 61.

Books
 A History of the English Turf- London, 1901
 An Anthology of Humorous Verse – London, 1902
 Spirals in Nature and Art – London, 1903
 The Water-Colour Drawings of J.M.W.TURNER, in the National Gallery, London, 1904.
 Twenty-five Great Houses of France
 Eclipse-1775, Persommon-1906 – London, 1907
 The Official Report of the Olympic Games of 1908 – London, 1908
 
 The Story of the Rouen – London, 1911
 Old Touraine. The Life and History of the Famous Chateaux of France 2 volumes 
 Old Provence. 2 volumes – London 1905
 The Curves of Life – London, 1914 
 The Sunlit Hours – London, 1926
 Character and Sportsmanship – London 1926
 International Sport - London 1909

References

Sources
 Margaret Prentice – Sir Theodore Andrea Cook, sometime of Wantage
 Obituary – The Times, 18 September 1928
 Obituary – The Field, 20 September 1928

External link

External links
 profile
 The Field magazine
 
 

1867 births
1928 deaths
British writers
Knights Bachelor
Olympic silver medalists in art competitions
People educated at Radley College
Medalists at the 1920 Summer Olympics
Olympic competitors in art competitions
Art competitors at the 1920 Summer Olympics